Bispham is the name of places in Lancashire, England

Bispham, Blackpool, a suburb
Bispham, West Lancashire, a civil parish
 Bispham Green, a village within that parish

It may also refer to:
 David Bispham, an American baritone
 Bispham Hall, a country house in Billinge, Wigan